Cauca may refer to:

 Cauca Department, an administrative division of Colombia
 Valle del Cauca Department, an administrative division of Colombia
 Cauca Department (Gran Colombia), former administrative division
 Cauca, an extinct Choco language
 Cauca River
 Coca, Segovia, Spain; the Latin name was Cauca
 Cauca guan, a bird
 Cauca (beetle), a genus of insects in the family Cerambycidae